This is a list of rivers of Papua New Guinea.

In alphabetical order

New Britain
Aemoi River
Apmi River
Balima River (Papua New Guinea)
Johanna River (New Britain)
Warangoi River

New Ireland
Aparam River
Lossuk River
Lumis River

Madang Province
The following are rivers in Madang Province for which various Madang language subgroups are named after.

See also

 List of rivers of Western New Guinea
 List of rivers of Indonesia
 Geography of Papua New Guinea

References

External links
 
 
 

 
Rivers
Papua New Guinea